India has large foreign-exchange reserves; holdings of cash, bank deposits, bonds, and other financial assets denominated in currencies other than India's national currency, the Indian rupee.  The reserves are managed by the Reserve Bank of India for the Indian government and the main component is foreign currency assets.

Foreign-exchange reserves act as the first line of defense for India in case of economic slowdown, but acquisition of reserves has its own costs. Foreign exchange reserves facilitate external trade and payment and promote orderly development and maintenance of foreign exchange market in India.

India's total foreign exchange (Forex) reserves stand at around US$573.72 billion on 20 Jan 2023, with the Foreign Currency Assets (FCA) component at around US$506.35 billion, Gold Reserves at around US$43.712 billion, SDRs (Special Drawing Rights with the IMF) of around US$18.43 billion and around US$5.226 billion Reserve Position in the IMF, as per Reserve Bank of India's (RBI) weekly statistical supplement published on 27 Jan 2023. The Economic survey of India 2014-15 said India could target foreign exchange reserves of US$750 billion-US$1 Trillion.

India's foreign exchange reserves are mainly composed of US dollar in the forms of US government bonds and institutional bonds. with nearly 7.34% of forex reserves in gold. The FCAs also include investments in US Treasury bonds, bonds of other selected governments and deposits with foreign central and commercial banks. As of September 2021, India holds fourth largest foreign-exchange reserves in the world following Switzerland.

Composition
Reserve Bank of India Act and the Foreign Exchange Management Act, 1999 set the legal provisions for governing the foreign exchange reserves. Reserve Bank of India accumulates foreign currency reserves by purchasing from authorized dealers in open market operations. Foreign exchange reserves of India act as a cushion against rupee volatility once global interest rates start rising.

The Foreign Exchange Reserves of India consists of below four categories;
 Foreign Currency Assets - Total FCA till March 2021 was $536.69 billion out of which $359.87 billion is invested in overseas securities, $153.39 billion is deposited with other central banks and $23.42 (4.36 percent of total FCA) billion is deposited with overseas commercial banks.
 Gold - As of March 2021 RBI held 695.31 metric tonnes of gold. 403.01 metric tonnes of which is in custody of Bank of England and Bank for International Settlements. 292.30 tonnes of gold is held domestically. 
 Special Drawing Rights (SDRs) 
 Reserve Tranche Position

Statistics

In 1960, forex reserves covered just 8.6 weeks of imports
In 1980, India had foreign exchange reserves of over U$7 billion, more than double the level (U$2.55 billion) of what China had at that time.
In 1990, forex reserves covered just 4.8 weeks of imports
 Foreign exchange reserves of India reached milestone of $100 billion mark only in 2004.
 India was forced to sell dollars to the extent of close to US$35 billion in the spot markets in Financial Year 2009 due to 22% depreciation in rupee (against the dollar) in the same fiscal year 2009.
 In 2009, India purchased 200 tonnes of gold from the International Monetary Fund, worth US$6.7bn (€4.57bn, £4.10bn).
 In June 2020, India's foreign exchange reserves crossed the US$500 billion mark for the first time.
 In June 2021, India's foreign exchange reserves crossed the US$600 billion mark for the first time.
 India's total forex reserves touched an all time high of US$642.453 billion on 8 September 2021. The reserves declined to $575.3 billion by 3 February 2023.

See also
 India related
 Economic survey of India
 Economy of India
 Remittances to India 
 Business process outsourcing to India
 Foreign trade of India
 List of exports of India
 Largest trading partners of India   
 Indian diaspora
 Indianisation

 Global lists and other nations
List of countries by foreign-exchange reserves (excluding gold)
List of countries by GDP (nominal)
List of countries by foreign-exchange reserves
Foreign-exchange reserves of China

References

External links
 IMF - India
 Reserve Bank of India

Finance in India
Foreign exchange reserves